The Oxford University Champion Tournament  was a men's grass court closed tennis tournament organised by the Oxford University Lawn Tennis Club, and played at Norham Gardens, Oxford, Oxfordshire, England from 1880 to 1888.

History
The Oxford University Tournament was an late 19th century tennis event first staged around June 1881 at Norham Gardens, Oxford, Oxfordshire, England. It was a closed tournament for current or former students of Oxford University. The first recorded winner of the men's singles was Britain's Robert Braddell. The final known edition was in 1888 that was won by England's Harry Stanley Scrivener.

Finals

Mens Singles
(Incomplete roll)
 1881— Robert Braddell def.  Thomas Poltimore Dimond, 6–4, 8–6, 6–2.
 1882— Edward Beaumont Cotton Curtis  def.  John Galbraith Horn, 3–6, 6–4, 6–0, 3–6, 7–5. 
 1883— Robert Theodore Milford def.  Herbert Carnegie Knox, 6–4, 6–3, 6–5.
 1885— Thomas Robinson Grey def.  J.S. Burton, 6–3, 5–7, 6–3, 6–3.
 1886— Howard Pease def.  William Parkfield Wethered, 6–3, 6–2, 2–6, 3–6, 6–1.
 1887— Thomas Musgrave Burton def.  Harry Stanley Scrivener, 2–6, 6–3, 6–2, 4–6, 8–6.
 1888— Harry Stanley Scrivener def. ?

Venue
The Oxford University Lawn Tennis Club (OULTC) was founded in 1879 that consisted of 12 grass courts laid out for the inaugural Oxford University Men's Doubles Championships, which were held in May of the same year. In 1927 the clubs name was changed to the Norham Gardens Lawn Tennis Club which is still in existence today.

References

Defunct tennis tournaments in the United Kingdom
Grass court tennis tournaments
Recurring sporting events established in 1880
Recurring sporting events disestablished in 1888
Tennis tournaments in England